Edward Hand (31 December 1744 – 3 September 1802) was an Irish soldier, physician, and politician who served in the Continental Army during the American Revolutionary War, rising to the rank of general, and later was a member of several Pennsylvania governmental bodies.

Early life and career
Hand was born in Clyduff, King's County (now County Offaly), Ireland, on 31 December 1744, and was baptised in Shinrone. His father was John Hand. Among his immediate neighbours were the Kearney family, ancestors of U.S. President Barack Obama. He was a descendant of either the families of Mag Fhlaithimh (of south Ulaidh and Mide) or Ó Flaithimhín (of the Síol Muireadaigh) who, through mistranslation (Flaithimh/Flaithimhín into Láimhín; laimh = hand), became Lavin or Hand.

Hand earned a medical certificate from Trinity College, Dublin. In 1767, Hand enlisted as a Surgeon's Mate in the 18th (Royal Irish) Regiment of Foot. On 20 May 1767, he sailed with the regiment from Cobh, Cork, Ireland, arriving at Philadelphia on 11 July 1767. In 1772, he was commissioned an ensign. He marched with the regiment to Fort Pitt, on the forks of the Ohio River, returning to Philadelphia in 1774, where he resigned his commission.

In 1774, Hand moved to Lancaster, Pennsylvania, where he practiced medicine. On 13 March 1775, he married Katherine Ewing (born 25 March 1751 in Philadelphia, Pennsylvania). Lancaster was the region of some of the earliest Irish and Scots-Irish settlements in Pennsylvania. Hand was active in forming the Lancaster County Associators, a colonial militia.

Hand was a 32nd degree Freemason, belonging to the Montgomery Military Lodge number 14.

American Revolution
Hand entered the Continental Army in 1775 as a lieutenant colonel in the 1st Pennsylvania Regiment under Colonel William Thompson. He was promoted to colonel in 1776 and placed in command of the 1st Continental (then designated the 1st Pennsylvania). Promoted to brigadier general in March 1777, he served as the commander of Fort Pitt, fighting British loyalists and their Indian allies. He was recalled, after over two years at Fort Pitt, to serve as a brigade commander in Major General La Fayette's division. 

In 1778, Hand attacked the Lenape, killing Captain Pipe's mother, brother, and a few of his children during a military campaign. Failing to distinguish among the Native American groups, Hand had attacked the neutral Lenape while trying to reduce the Indian threat to settlers in the Ohio Country, because other tribes, such as the Shawnee, had allied with the British.

Planning for a campaign against the Iroquois was already under way, and Hand’s frontier experience naturally recommended him as a participant. In the resulting Sullivan-Clinton Iroquois Expedition (May-November 1779) through the Southern Tier and Finger Lakes regions of New York, Edward Hand commanded the Third Brigade, composed of the Fourth and Eleventh Pennsylvania Regiments, the German Regiment, Proctor’s Artillery, Captain James Parr’s Riflemen, Captain Anthony Selin’s Riflemen, and two Wyoming companies. The brigade composed the “Light Corps” of Sullivan’s army and formed its vanguard. The journals kept by the officers on the expedition indicate that Hand played a major role in the success of the campaign. When he rejoined his family in Lancaster at the close of the year he was thirty-five years old, the youngest of the brigadiers.

After a few months, he was appointed Adjutant General of the Continental Army and served during the siege of Yorktown in that capacity. In recognition of his long and distinguished service, he was, in September 1783, promoted by brevet to major general. He resigned from the Army in November 1783.

He was an original member of the Society of the Cincinnati.

After the Revolution

Hand returned to Lancaster and resumed the practice of medicine. A Federalist, Hand was active in civil affairs, holding posts that included:
 Chief Burgess of Lancaster
 Presidential elector
 Delegate to the convention for the 1790 Pennsylvania Constitution
 Member of the Congress of the Confederation, 1784–1785
 Member of the Pennsylvania Assembly, 1785–1786

Beginning in 1785, he owned and operated Rock Ford plantation, a  farm on the banks of the Conestoga River, one mile (1.6 km) south of Lancaster, Pennsylvania. The Georgian brick mansion remains today; the farm is a historic site open to the public. Hand was also an enslaver, owning several enslaved people, one of whom, Frank, ran away in 1802. 

Hand is suspected to have died from typhoid, dysentery or pneumonia at Rock Ford in 1802. Medical records are unclear, but some sources state Hand died of cholera. There is no evidence Lancaster County suffered from a cholera epidemic in 1802. Hand is buried in St. James's Episcopal Cemetery in Lancaster, the same church where he had served as a deacon.

References

External links

Hand’s congressional biography

Rock Ford Plantation
 The Edward Hand papers, which cover Hand's military career during the 1770s and 1780s, are available for research use at the Historical Society of Pennsylvania.
 American Revolution Institute

1744 births
1802 deaths
Military personnel from County Offaly
Irish soldiers in the British Army
American slave owners
Irish slave owners
18th-century Irish people
19th-century Irish people
Politicians from County Offaly
Adjutants general of the United States Army
Physicians in the American Revolution
Royal Irish Regiment (1684–1922) officers
Continental Army generals
Continental Army officers from Pennsylvania
Continental Army officers from Ireland
Continental Congressmen from Pennsylvania
18th-century American politicians
Politicians from Lancaster, Pennsylvania
1789 United States presidential electors
1792 United States presidential electors
Kingdom of Ireland emigrants to the Thirteen Colonies
Irish emigrants to the United States (before 1923)
Physicians from Pennsylvania